Brazikumab (INN; development code MEDI2070) is a human monoclonal antibody designed for the treatment of Crohn's disease. that targets IL-23.

This drug was developed by MedImmune.

References 

Monoclonal antibodies
AstraZeneca brands